Cefalà Diana (Sicilian: Cifalà Diana) is a comune (municipality) in the Metropolitan City of Palermo in the Italian region Sicily, located about  southeast of Palermo.

Cefalà Diana borders the following municipalities: Marineo, Mezzojuso, Villafrati.

Demographic evolution

References

Municipalities of the Metropolitan City of Palermo